Aprophata ruficollis is a species of beetle in the family Cerambycidae. It was described by Heller in 1916. It is known from the Philippines.

References

Pteropliini
Beetles described in 1916